The Verkhnetulomskoye Reservoir is a large reservoir on the Kola Peninsula, Murmansk Oblast, Russia. It impounds the river Tuloma. It was constructed in 1964-1965, and has an area of 745 km². Since the construction of the reservoir, the former Lake Notozero has been submerged.

References

Bodies of water of Murmansk Oblast
RVerkhnetulomskoye
Reservoirs in Russia